Janaki Ram is an Indian-American author who has written biographies and collections of short stories, as well as a prominent figure in Asian art auctions. She is a relative of V. K. Krishna Menon and Sir C. P. Ramaswami Iyer and a member of the powerful South Indian Vengalil family. She was a founder and convenor of INTACH previous to her writing career.

References

American women writers of Indian descent
American Hindus
Year of birth missing (living people)
Living people
American short story writers
American women non-fiction writers
21st-century American women